Seljani may refer to:

Seljani (Konjic), village in the municipality of Konjic, Bosnia and Herzegovina
Seljani (Nevesinje), village in the municipality of Nevesinje, Bosnia and Herzegovina 
Seljani, Plužine, village in Montenegro
Filippoi, formerly called Seljani, in Greece